The African Journal of International Affairs and Development is a peer-reviewed biannual academic journal covering the study of Africa in global affairs and development. It is hosted by African Journals OnLine.

External links 
 

International relations journals
Biannual journals
Publications established in 1995
English-language journals
African studies journals
Development studies journals